The 2003–04 Japan Ice Hockey League season was the 38th and final season of the Japan Ice Hockey League. Four teams participated in the league, and Kokudo Ice Hockey Club won the championship.

Regular season

First round

Second round

External links
 Season on hockeyarchives.info

Japan
Japan
Japan Ice Hockey League seasons
Japan